An Oceania Championship is a top level international sports competition between Oceania athletes or sports teams representing their respective countries or professional sports clubs.

List of Championships 
49er & 49er FX Oceania Championships
FIBA Oceania Championship
FIBA Oceania Women's Championship
ICC EAP Cricket Trophy
ICC EAP Cricket Trophy (One day)
Oceania Amateur Boxing Championships
Oceania Area Championships in Athletics
Oceania Badminton Championships
Oceania Baseball Championship
Oceania Chess Championship
Oceania Cross Country Championships
Oceania Cup
Oceania Diving Championships
Oceania Handball Nations Cup
Oceania Race Walking Championships
Oceania Shooting Championships
Oceania Swimming Championships
Oceania Table Tennis Championships
OFC Beach Soccer Championship
OFC Champions League
OFC Futsal Championship
OFC Nations Cup
OFC Women's Nations Cup
Pacific-Asia Curling Championships
Pacific-Asia Junior Curling Championships
Asia Pacific Bowls Championships

See also 

 Pacific Games, a multi-sport event between competitors from all nations in Oceania
 Championship
 World championship
 African Championship
 Asian Championship
 European Championship
 European Junior Championships (disambiguation)
 Pan American Championship
 Central American Championships (disambiguation)
 North American Championship
 Canadian Championships
 South American Championship

Sport in Oceania
Sports competitions in Oceania
Oceanian international sports competitions